Oswego  is an unincorporated community in Valley County, Montana, United States. It is located along U.S. Route 2 between the cities of Frazer and Wolf Point. Oswego is located on the Fort Peck Indian Reservation.

History
Settled sometime in the 1890s, the village was named after Oswego, New York, the hometown of some early-day settlers.  A post office was located there from 1896 until 1971.  On September 11, 1971 one of the worst prairie fires in northeastern Montana destroyed much of Oswego, leaving only 4 homes untouched.  The entire population of Oswego was forced to evacuate, and of those 75 residents only about 40 of them returned to live and rebuild.

References

External links
MTLinks - Oswego, Montana

Unincorporated communities in Montana
Unincorporated communities in Valley County, Montana
Fort Peck Assiniboine and Sioux Tribes